This is a list of the current city districts of Gdańsk. Former districts are listed at the bottom.

Modern division of administrative districts of Gdańsk (since 2019) 

The city of Gdańsk was divided into 34 administrative districts (dzielnica administracyjna) from 2010 to 2018. The City of Gdańsk has been divided into 35 administrative districts since March 2019:

Former districts
Chełm i Gdańsk Południe, divided into:
Chełm
Jasień
Orunia Górna-Gdańsk Południe
Ujeścisko-Łostowice
Stogi z Przeróbką, divided into:
Stogi
Przeróbka
Wrzeszcz, divided into:
Wrzeszcz Dolny
Wrzeszcz Górny

External links 
 Podział administracyjny Gdańska (Polish)

 
Gdansk
Gdansk
Neighbourhoods